HKMA may refer to:

Hong Kong Medical Association
Hong Kong Monetary Authority